PA35 may refer to:
 Pennsylvania Route 35
 Pennsylvania's 35th congressional district
 Piper PA-35 Pocono